Rosa Elia Romero Guzmán (born 14 May 1973) is a Mexican politician affiliated with the Labor Party, formerly from the PRD. As of 2013 she served as Deputy of the LXII Legislature of the Mexican Congress representing Oaxaca. She also served as Deputy during the LX Legislature.

References

1973 births
Living people
Politicians from Oaxaca
Women members of the Chamber of Deputies (Mexico)
Party of the Democratic Revolution politicians
Labor Party (Mexico) politicians
21st-century Mexican politicians
21st-century Mexican women politicians
People from Huajuapan de León
Deputies of the LXII Legislature of Mexico
Members of the Chamber of Deputies (Mexico) for Oaxaca